Why Men Work is a 1924 short comedy film featuring Charley Chase, directed by Leo McCarey The Los Angeles Times  described it as "the adventures of an amateur news-reel photographer when he attempts to take some pictures of a visiting governor".

Cast 

Charley Chase
Olive Borden
Billy Engle
William Gillespie
Katherine Grant
Earl Mohan

See also 

 List of United States comedy films

References

External links 

1924 films
1924 short films
American silent short films
1924 comedy films
American black-and-white films
Films directed by Leo McCarey
Silent American comedy films
American comedy short films
1920s American films